Coombe is an alternate spelling of combe, a dry valley.

It may also refer to:

Places

Australia
Coombe, South Australia, a locality in the Coorong District Council

England
 Coombe, Buckinghamshire
 Coombe, Camborne, Cornwall
 Coombe, Gwennap, Cornwall (near Redruth)
 Coombe, Kea, Cornwall (near Truro)
 Coombe, Liskeard, Cornwall
 Coombe Junction Halt railway station
 Coombe, Morwenstow, Cornwall (near Bude)
 Coombe, St Stephen-in-Brannel, Cornwall (near St Austell)
 Coombe, East Devon, Devon (near Sidmouth)
 Coombe, Mid Devon, Devon (near Tiverton)
 Coombe, Teignmouth, Teignbridge, Devon
 Coombe, Dorset (in Whitchurch Canonicorum)
 Coombe, Gloucestershire
 Coombe, Hampshire
 Coombe, Kent
 Coombe, Croydon, London
 Coombe, Kingston upon Thames, London
 Coombe, Crewkerne, Somerset
 Coombe, Taunton, Somerset
 Coombe, Donhead St. Mary, Wiltshire
 Coombe, Enford, Wiltshire
 Coombe Bissett, Wiltshire
 Coombe Dingle, Bristol
 Combe Fields, Warwickshire
 Coombe Abbey, former country house, now a hotel
 Coombe Country Park, the former grounds of the house
 Coombe Hill Canal, Vale of Gloucester
 Coombe Keynes, Dorset

Ireland
 The Coombe, Dublin, a historic street in Dublin

United States
 Coombe Historic District, Felton, Kent County, Delaware

People
Dorothy Coombe (1896–1982), Australian trade unionist
E. H. Coombe (1858–1917), South Australian newspaper editor and politician
Robert Coombe, American chemist and educator
Rosemary J. Coombe, Canadian anthropologist and lawyer
Roy R. Coombe (1924-2016), American newspaper editor, businessman, and politician
Thomas Coombe (1873–1959), Australian businessman

Other uses
 Coombe Hall (1871–1932), Scottish footballer who played for Blackburn Rovers
 Coombe Cellars, a public house in south Devon, England
 Coombe Boys' School, a secondary school, New Malden, London, England
 Coombe Clipless Pedal, a type of bicycle pedal
 Coombe Dean School, a specialist secondary school in Plymouth, Devon, England
 Coombe Girls' School, an all-female secondary school in New Malden, South-West London, England
 Coombe Women's Hospital, Dublin, Ireland
 Coombe Wood, a garden in the London Borough of Croydon, England

See also
 Coombs (disambiguation)
 Cwm (disambiguation)
 Combe (disambiguation)
 Combs (surname)
 Coomb (disambiguation)
 Coombes (surname)
 Coombe Hill (disambiguation)
 Coombes, West Sussex, England